Günterstal Abbey, earlier also Güntersthal Abbey ( or Güntersthal), was a Cistercian nunnery that existed from 1221 to 1806 located in Günterstal, which today is a district in Freiburg im Breisgau, Germany.

History 
The first documented reference to Günterstal Abbey is dated 15 September 1224, when Konrad von Tegerfelden, Bishop of Constance, inaugurated a new altar in the chapel of the as yet unfinished nunnery. In later writings, the abbey gives its year of foundation as 1221. A nobleman of the nearby Burg Kybfelsen is said to have founded the abbey for his daughters Adelheid and Berta, who were joined by other women seeking to live in a monastic community. Early on the new foundation came into contact with Tennenbach Abbey, a Cistercian monastery. It is presumed that Günterstal's admission to the Cistercian Order took place soon after 1224. The abbot of Tennenbach was ex officio also the supervising abbot of Günterstal until circa 1380. As such, he oversaw its administration, conducted visitations, and was responsible for the appointment of the abbess and her inauguration.

In 1233, Pope Gregory IX confirmed the possessions of the nunnery. In 1238 the community moved to Oberried, only to be relocated back to Günterstal six years later. In 1246, Pope Innocent IV confirmed its possessions again, which had grown in the meantime through gifts and donations. Among the most important gifts was the Günterstaler Dinghof (a farm) which St Peter's Abbey had exchanged for a farm in Scherzingen. A property register from 1344 shows that the nunnery owned property in up to 90 locations including an estate in Mundenhof which is now the animal sanctuary and park. At this time the village of Günterstal consisted of twenty-five houses. The nobility of the region, such as the Küchlin, Geben and Schnewlin families, made frequent gifts to the abbey: their unmarried daughters who wanted to enter it had to give all of their possessions to it, unlike a Damenstift (community of secular canonesses). The abbesses sat in the Landstände of Further Austria.  The abbey chose its Vögte from the local nobility which supported it (for example, the families of Schnewlin, Falkenstein and Blumegg).

The residents of the abbey consisted on the one hand of the nuns, from the nobility,  and on the other, lay sisters and servants. The chaplain and the confessor were provided by Tennenbach Abbey. The nunnery was also involved in reclaiming land by clearing forests. As early as 1278 the need for bigger premises became apparent. In 1279 the first abbess, Adelheid (d. 1281), resigned from her position.

In 1486 the abbey was damaged by a flood. In times of war it was plundered several times. During the Peasants' War in May 1525, Abbess Agnes von Tusslingen fled to Freiburg where she later died. The abbey was plundered by the peasants and later claimed compensation of 2,218 gulden. In 1632, the nuns escaped the Swedish army by the skin of their teeth by fleeing to Rheinau Abbey.
 

In 1674, under Abbess Agnes von Greuth, the abbey released its serfs from their serfdom. After improvement in the abbey's financial situation it was decided in 1727, under Abbess Maria Rosa von Neveu, to replace the old conventual building with a new one. Between 1728 and 1748, under Abbess Maria Franziska Cajetanna von Zurthannen, completely new Baroque premises were constructed according to designs by Peter Thumb.

Secularisation 
The abbey survived the Josephine reforms of the 1780s. On 30 January 1806, the Electorate of Baden declared that all monasteries, nunneries and other religious communities in the Breisgau were abolished and on 3 February Günterstal Abbey was formally seized. The abbess and nuns received pensions from the state and left the abbey before October 25. The last survivor of the community died in 1843.

The abbess 
The last abbess was Maria Francisca von Thurn und Valsassina, in office from 1770 to 1806.

After secularisation 
The company Friedrich Mez & Co., established on 1 June 1812, bought the principal conventual building along with the ancillary buildings and land on 5 September 1812 for 8,000 Gulden. They constructed a cotton mill, which had to be auctioned off soon after, in 1817. The new owners, Benedict and Marquard von Hermann, then hired mainly children from the ages of 12-14 to work at the mill. In the night of 3–4 April 1829, the mill was burnt almost completely to the ground, among rumours of arson, perhaps even by the owner himself. A reward was offered for any information relating to the crime.

The south and west wings of the former abbey building were completely destroyed, and the other two wings were burnt down to the first floor. These two wings were reconstructed again. However, the cotton mill was replaced by a brewery. In a neighbouring building, a weaving mill was being run. After the death of the owner in 1840, his widow sold the brewery to Gustav Schelte in 1845. The weaving mill continued to be operated by the family of von Hermann. In 1859 other shareholders were added, who led the enterprise under the company name Mechanische Baumwoll-Weberei Güntersthal until it was completely taken over by a Swiss shareholder named Gottlieb Siebenmann. The brewery had already been purchased in the name of the Catholic Orphanage Foundation in 1892 by Mathäus Jungmaier, who had constructed an orphanage there. In 1896 the foundation purchased the whole of the former conventual premises. Today they are occupied by the boarding house of the Deutsch-Französische Gymnasium of Freiburg, a kindergarten and various social facilities.

The abbey church 
The former abbey church, now known as the Liebfrauenkirche (the Church of Our Lady), which was also destroyed in the fire of 1829, was rebuilt by the state in 1833/34 to plans by Gottlieb Lumpp, who reused parts of the old frontage. It was renovated between 1998 and 2002, when efforts were made to keep as much as possible of the original interior design. Today, the church is used by the Catholic pastoral care organisation Freiburg Wiehre-Günterstal.

References

Bibliography 
 Josef Bader: Die Schicksale des ehemaligen Frauenstifts Güntersthal bei Freiburg i. Br.  In: Freiburger Diözesan Archiv Band 5 (1870) pp. 119–206  online, UB Freiburg
 Ernst Dreher: Das Kloster Günterstal: von d. Wahl d. letzten Äbtissin (1770) bis zur Franz. Revolution (1789). In: Schau-ins-Land, Bd. 108 (1989), pp. 169–194 online, UB Freiburg
 Ernst Dreher: Die Äbtissinnen des Zisterzienserinnenklosters Günterstal. In: Freiburger Diözesan Archiv Band 120 (2000) S.  5-51 online, UB Freiburg
 Ernst Dreher: Kirche, Kloster und Kapellen in Günterstal. In: Schau-ins-Land, Bd. 106 (1987), pp. 31–68 online, UB Freiburg
 Ernst Dreher: Anmerkungen zur Gründungsgeschichte der Zisterzienserinnenklöster Wonnental und Günterstal. In: Schau-ins-Land, Bd. 110 (1991), pp. 109–118 online, UB Freiburg
 Ernst Dreher: Günterstal im Jahre 1795. In: Schau-ins-Land, Bd. 112 (1993), pp. 105–134 online, UB Freiburg
 Ernst Dreher: Die Gemeinde Günterstal zwischen 1806 und 1830, In: Schau-ins-Land, Bd. 114 (1995), pp. 135–161  online, UB Freiburg
 Ernst Dreher: Die Gemeinde Günterstal von 1806 bis 1830 (2. Teil). In: Schau-ins-Land, Bd. 116 (1997), pp. 253–281 online, UB Freiburg
 Karl Suso Frank: Kath. Pfarrkirche Liebfrauen Freiburg-Günterstal, Kunstverlag Josef Fink, Lichtenberg, 2005, 
 Franz Josef Gemmert: Die Schicksale der Textilfabriken in den säkularisierten Breisgauer Klöstern. In: Schau-ins-Land, Bd. 77 (1959), pp. 62–89, Günterstal pp. 76–82 online, UB Freiburg
 Constanze Kienast: Sei im Besitze und du wohnst im Recht. Der Günterstaler Berain von 1344: ein typischer Vertreter mittelalterlicher Güterverzeichnisse?. In: Schau-ins-Land, Bd. 112 (1993), pp. 31–48 online, UB Freiburg
 Albert Krieger, Badische Historische Kommission [ed.]: Topographisches Wörterbuch des Großherzogtums Baden, Band 1, Spalte 792-797 Heidelberg, 1904 online, UB Heidelberg
 Fritz Ziegler: Wappenskulpturen des Klosters Günterstal. In: Schau-ins-Land, Bd. 51-53 (1926), pp. 88–92 online, UB Freiburg

External links 

 

 Fridrich Pfaff: Der Günterstaler Palmesel. In: Alemannia. Zeitschrift für alemannische und fränkische Geschichte, Volkskunde, Kunst und Sprache. Vol. 39, Freiburg im Breisgau bei Friedrich Ernst Fehsenfeld, 1911, p. 160 
 "Kloster Günterstal", badische-seiten.de, retrieved 25 March 2014 
 "Liebfrauenkirche Günterstal", badische-seiten.de, retrieved 26 March 2014 
 "Historische Gebäude - ehem. Zisterzienserinnenkloster", Stiftungsverwaltung Freiburg, retrieved 25 March 2014 

Buildings and structures in Freiburg im Breisgau
Roman Catholic churches in Baden-Württemberg
Cistercian nunneries in Germany
Monasteries in Baden-Württemberg